Afanasiy Ilich Tobonov  (Афанасий Ильич Тобонов) (May 11, 1945 -  August 28, 2009) was a Russian veterinarian who established that fuel from stages ejected from rockets launched from the Baikonur cosmodrome was the cause of death for livestock and wildlife.

References

 Summary: Most work focused on the effects of residual rocket fuel (heptane) RN "Rokot" held a committee member "Vilyuy" Athanasius I. Tobon. Veterinary education, it is best understood in rocket fuels, knew all about their impact on wildlife and the environment. Through the efforts of AI Tobonova suspended parts separating from the launch vehicles at the site Horula. Athanasius Ilyich keeps close contact with a member of the Federation Council Commission for the protection of legal persons and citizens from the adverse effects of space-rocket activity Nikolai Ivanovich Solomovym.
https://web.archive.org/web/20111009110604/http://www.sakhasire.com/index.php?itemid=600

Russian veterinarians
Deaths from liver cancer
2009 deaths
1945 births